Brazil competed at the 2004 Summer Olympics in Athens, Greece, from 13 to 29 August 2004. This was the nation's nineteenth appearance at the Summer Olympics, excluding the 1928 Summer Olympics in Amsterdam. The Brazilian Olympic Committee (COB) sent the nation's largest ever delegation in history to the Games. A total of 243 athletes, 124 men and 119 women, competed in 24 sports.

Brazil left Athens with a total of 10 medals (5 golds, 2 silver, and 3 bronze), the lowest in Summer Olympics since 1992. Although the nation's final medal count could not surpass its previous records set in Atlanta (15 medals) and Sydney (12 medals), Brazil produced a record of five golds at these edition, a performance only surpassed 12 years later in Rio de Janeiro, when Brazil was the host country and won seven gold medals.

Brazil conquered its first gold medal ever in Equestrian as also in a mixed Olympic event, with the gold medal won by Rodrigo Pessoa in individual jumping.

Summary

Until the Athens 2004 Games, Brazil had only a two-time Olympic champion, the legendary Adhemar Ferreira da Silva, who shone on the triple jump in Helsinki-1952 and Melbourne-1956. That changed when sailor Robert Scheidt shone in the Laser class and secured his second gold medal (he had already been champion in Atlanta 1996).

Also in the sailing, Torben Grael and Marcelo Ferreira reached gold in the Star class. Both became two-time Olympic champions since they had won in Atlanta-1996. With the achievement, Torben Grael wrote his name in history (at the time) as the greatest Olympic athlete in Brazil at all times, with five medals ( a performance also matched by Robert Scheidt 8 years later ). He is also one of the sailors with the largest number of Olympic medals at all times, along with Robert Scheidt and British Ben Ainslie.

In the men's volleyball the team coached by the victorious Bernardo Rezende and led by Gilberto Godoy Filho, who started the greatest era of achievements with the Brazil men's national volleyball team, Brazil defeated Italy in the final by 3 to 1 and secured the second gold medal of national volleyball in the Olympic Games. In the team were Maurício Lima and Giovane Gávio, unique remnants of the historic triumph of the tournament of Barcelona 1992.

In men's beach volleyball, Emanuel Rego and Ricardo Santos defeated the Spaniards Javier Bosma and Pablo Herrera in the final and secured the gold. It was the first gold medal ever won by Brazilian men in beach volleyball. In women's beach volleyball  Shelda Bede and Adriana Behar again came to the decision, but as they did four years earlier in Sydney, they silver medalists, after losing to Kerri Walsh and Misty May.

Led by Formiga and Marta, women's national football team finally won the first Olympic medal ever. The team advanced to the final against United States. After a very tough match with a draw of 1–1 in regular time, the Americans won the gold medal match by 2–1 at extra time, leaving Brazil with the silver medal.

Brazilian judokas won two more podiums for Brazil. Leandro Guilheiro was responsible for giving the country the first medal in Athens, the bronze in men's 81 kg. The second Brazilian medal in that edition also came from judo, with the bronze of Flávio Canto, in men's 81 kg category.

In the men's marathon, one of the most remarkable scenes of the Athens 2004 Games, which gained worldwide notoriety, involved the marathon runner Vanderlei de Lima. He was leading the race, which closes the Olympics, when, at the time of the 36th of the 42 kilometers of the race, he was attacked by Irish religious fanatic Cornelius Horan. The Brazilian was pushed off the track by Cornelius. Despite that, Vanderlei returned to the race, but with the time lost in the unforeseen event, he was overtaken by the Italian Stefano Baldini and the American Mebrahtom Keflezighi. Vanderlei, meanwhile, maintained the third position and, thus, was left with the bronze medal. He was the first and so far the only Brazilian marathon runner to obtain an Olympic medal. Later, Vanderlei de Lima received the prestigious Pierre de Coubertin Medal to his achievements for sportsmanship. The medal, one of the most important awarded by the International Olympic Committee, is dedicated to athletes who value sport more than victory itself. At the 2016 Summer Olympics in Rio de Janeiro, Vanderlei de Lima received the honour of lighting the Olympic Flame as the final member of the torch relay.

Brazilian equestrian and show jumper Rodrigo Pessoa was the originally the silver medalist in individual jumping. On October 8, 2004, the International Federation for Equestrian Sports ordered a suspension for Ireland's Cian O'Connor after his horse Waterford Crystal failed a doping test for fluphenazine and zuclopenthixol. Because O'Connor decided not to appeal and formally strip off his Olympic title in men's show jumping, silver Rodrigo Pessoa was subsequently awarded and received his gold medal at a public ceremony on Copacabana Beach in August 2005. This was the first and so far the only gold medal won by Brazil not only in Equestrian as also in a mixed Olympic event.

Medalists

| width=78% align=left valign=top |

|  style="text-align:left; width:22%; vertical-align:top;"|

Athletics 

Brazilian athletes have so far achieved qualifying standards in the following athletics events (up to a maximum of 3 athletes in each event at the 'A' Standard, and 1 at the 'B' Standard). Marathon runner Vanderlei de Lima was awarded a prestigious Pierre de Coubertin Medal from the International Olympic Committee for sportsmanship after being attacked by Irish protester Cornelius Horan, who pushed him off the road four miles from the finish line.

Men
Track & road events

Field events

Women
Track & road events

Field events

Basketball

Women's tournament

Roster

Group play

Quarterfinal

Semifinal

Bronze Medal Final

Boxing

Canoeing

Sprint

Qualification Legend: Q = Qualify to final; q = Qualify to semifinal

Cycling

Road

Mountain biking

Diving 

Men

Women

Equestrian

Brazil has qualified two teams in eventing and jumping. Show jumper Rodrigo Pessoa originally claimed a silver medal in men's show jumping. On October 8, 2004, International Federation for Equestrian Sports announced that Waterford Crystal, owned by Ireland's Cian O'Connor, failed a horse doping test for fluphenazine and zuclopenthixol that formally stripped off O'Connor's Olympic title in early 2005. Pessoa was eventually presented with his gold medal at a ceremony on Copacabana Beach in August 2005.

Eventing

"#" indicates that the score of this rider does not count in the team competition, since only the best three results of a team are counted.

Show jumping

*Won in jump-off

Fencing

Men

Women

Football

Women's tournament

Roster

Group play

Quarterfinal

Semifinal

Gold Medal Final

 Won Silver Medal

Gymnastics

Artistic
Brazil qualified a women's team and an individual man.
Men

Women
Team

Individual finals

Rhythmic

Handball

Men's tournament

Roster

Group play

9th–10th Classification

Women's tournament

Roster

Group play

Quarterfinal

5th–8th Classification Semifinal

7th–8th Place Final

Judo

Men

Women

Modern pentathlon

Brazil has qualified a single spot each in the men's and women's event.

Rowing

Men

Women

Qualification Legend: FA=Final A (medal); FB=Final B (non-medal); FC=Final C (non-medal); FD=Final D (non-medal); FE=Final E (non-medal); FF=Final F (non-medal); SA/B=Semifinals A/B; SC/D=Semifinals C/D; SE/F=Semifinals E/F; R=Repechage

Sailing

Men

Women

Open

M = Medal race; OCS = On course side of the starting line; DSQ = Disqualified; DNF = Did not finish; DNS= Did not start; RDG = Redress given

Shooting 

Men

Swimming

Brazilian swimmers earned qualifying standards in the following events (up to a maximum of 2 swimmers in each event at the A-standard time, and 1 at the B-standard 
time):

Men

Women

Synchronized swimming 

Brazil has qualified 2 quota places in synchronized swimming.

Table tennis

Brazil has qualified two spots each in the men's and women's doubles.

Taekwondo

Tennis

Triathlon

Brazil brought five veterans to the second Olympic triathlon.  Once again, two triathletes did not finish (Carla Moreno started both, but finished neither).

Volleyball

Beach

Indoor

Men's tournament

Roster

Group play

Quarterfinal

Semifinal

Gold Medal Final

 Won Gold Medal

Women's tournament

Roster

Group play

Quarterfinal

Semifinal

Bronze Medal Final

Wrestling 

Men's freestyle

See also
Brazil at the 2003 Pan American Games
Brazil at the 2004 Summer Paralympics

References

External links
Official Report of the XXVIII Olympiad
Brazilian Olympic Committee 

Nations at the 2004 Summer Olympics
2004
Summer Olympics